Deer Park School District is a school district headquartered in Deer Park, New York.

Schools
Secondary:
 Deer Park High School
 Robert Frost Middle School

Primary:
 John F. Kennedy Intermediate School
 John Quincy Adams Primary School
 May Moore Primary School

References

External links
 

School districts in New York (state)